Suzannah Mirghani, is a Qatar-based Sudanese-Russian scriptwriter, researcher, and independent filmmaker. She is best known for the award-winning 2021 short film Al-Sit. Currently, Mirghani is an Assistant Director for Publications at the Center for International and Regional Studies (CIRS) at Georgetown University in Qatar.

Personal life
She is married to Rodney X Sharkey. Her sister Julietta Mirghani is also a film producer.

Career
She has graduated with degrees in media studies and museum studies from University College London Qatar (UCL Qatar). In 2011, she acted in the short Re:Move directed by Eric Priezkalns by playing the lead role. In the same year, she made directorial debut with the short Hamour. In 2014, she directed the short film Hind's Dream which received critics acclaim and won the award for "artistic vision and poetic screenwriting" at the 2014 Ajyal Film Festival. In 2015, the short also made official selection for the short film corner at 2015 Cannes Film Festival. With that success, she directed her next short Caravan in 2016.

In 2021, she directed the short film Al-Sit, which became a milestone in her cinema career. The film won 23 international awards, including three Academy Award qualifying prizes in 2021 where critics considered the film as one of the finest Sudanese films to date. Apart from that the film was automatically qualified to enter the competition category for short films at the Academy Awards (Oscars) after winning the Grand Prix award at the Tampere International Film Festival 2021 in Finland. Mirghani also won the International Short Films Competition Award for the Best Director at the Beirut International Women Film Festival, Excellence in Women's Filmmaking award at the ECU European Independent Film Festival and Excellence in Women's Filmmaking for dramatic Short at The European Independent Film Festival.

In 2020, she was selected to be a jury member of Sudan International Film Festival (SIFF). In 2021, she made a documentary Virtual Voice, which premiered at Tribeca Film Festival. In the meantime, she started her maiden feature film Cotton Queen, a story set in the cotton fields of Sudan. Both films were later selected at Qumra 2021.

Apart from cinema, she is also an author and editor of several academic books as well as published short stories and poetry. She has authored "Target Markets: International Terrorism Meets Global Capitalism in the Mall" (Transcript Press, 2017); “Consumer Citizenship: National Identity and Museum Merchandise in Qatar,” Middle East Journal 73, no. 4 (2019). She is the editor of Art and Cultural Production in the Gulf Cooperation Council, Routledge, in 2017. She is also the co-editor of Bullets and Bulletins such "Media and Politics in the Wake of the Arab Uprisings" and "Food Security in the Middle East". In the meantime, she contributed and appeared in 2007 International Feminist Journal of Politics, and 2009 Journeys Home: An Anthology of Contemporary African Diasporic Experience.

Filmography

References

External links
 

Living people
Sudanese film directors
Sudanese people
Qatari journalists
Sudanese film producers
Sudanese filmmakers
Year of birth missing (living people)